Tamara Kasymqyzy Duisenova (born 11 January 1965) is a Kazakh politician who is serving as the Minister of Labour and Social Protection of the Population since April 2022. She previously served in same post from June 2013 to August 2014 and from January 2017 to February 2018, Minister of Healthcare and Social Development from August 2014 to January 2017.

Early life and education 
Duisenova was born in the village of Leninskoye in Turkistan Region. In 1987, she graduated from the Tashkent State University of Economics with a degree in engineer-economist.

Early career 
Duisenova began her career in 1988 as a high school teacher in computer science in the Saryagash District. From 1988 to 1992, she worked as an economist at the Research Institute of Economics and Standards under the State Planning Committee of the Uzbek SSR.

In 1992, Duisenova became a senior economist in the Saryagash Regional Administration. From 1993 to 1994, she served as the head of the department of the Perizat-holding company.

Political career 
From 1994 to 1997, Duisenova was an adviser, deputy and first deputy akim of the Saryagash District. In 1997, she became the first deputy akim of the city of Shymkent. From 1999 to 2002, Duisenova served as a deputy akim of South Kazakhstan Region until she was appointed as a Vice Minister of Labor and Social Protection in 2002. She again became the deputy akim of South Kazakhstan in 2006 until becoming the executive secretary of the Ministry of Labor and Social Protection. 

In February 2013, Duisenova was appointed to be the Vice Minister Labor and Social Protection and from 10 June 2013, she served as the Acting Minister until becoming fully appointed to the position on 27 June 2013. 

After the ministry was abolished on 6 August 2014, Duisenova served as the Minister of Healthcare and Social Development until 25 January 2017 when Ministry of Labor and Social Protection was reestablished. She was dismissed on 9 February 2018 and was shortly appointed as a secretary of Nur Otan on 22 February 2018. Duisenova served the post until being relieved on 9 July 2019 and becoming head of the JCS Center for the Development of Human Resources on 15 July 2019. 

On 5 May 2020, she became an assistant to President Kassym-Jomart Tokayev and the head of the Department for Control over the Consideration of Appeals of the Administration of the President.

References 

1965 births
Nur Otan politicians
People from Turkistan Region
Government ministers of Kazakhstan
Ministers of Health (Kazakhstan)
Living people
21st-century Kazakhstani women politicians
21st-century Kazakhstani politicians